Joachim Mbadu Kikhela Kupika (10 March 1932 – 12 March 2019) was a Democratic Republic of the Congo Roman Catholic bishop.

Early life 
Mbadu Kikhela Kupika was born in the Democratic Republic of the Congo and was ordained to the priesthood in 1959. He served as coadjutor and diocesan bishop of the Roman Catholic Diocese of Boma, Democratic Republic of the Congo from 1975 to 2001.

Notes

1932 births
2019 deaths
20th-century Roman Catholic bishops in the Democratic Republic of the Congo
Roman Catholic bishops of Boma
21st-century Democratic Republic of the Congo people